The FK-League is the top league for futsal clubs in South Korea. It is organized by Korea Futsal League from 2010-11 season.

Clubs

Men
 Busan Kappa FC 
 Chungbuk Jecheon FS 
 Daejeon IFC
 Dream Hub Gunsan FS
 Fantasia Bucheon FS
 FITF
 Jeonju MAG FC
 FS Seoul
 Seoul Eunpyeong FS
 Seoul Gwangjin FC
 Yes Gumi FS
 Yongin FS

Former clubs
 Gyeongju Soonwoo FC
 Daegu Osung FC

Women
 Busan Kappa WFC
 Daejeon Blue-i
 Yongin Ladies FS
 FS Hornets
 Jeonbuk Gimje Philos WFC
 FS Seoul Ladies

List of champions

References

External links
 Official Website
 Facebook

 
Futsal in South Korea
Football leagues in South Korea
South Korea
Sports leagues established in 2009
2009 establishments in South Korea
Professional sports leagues in South Korea